Sahifah of al-Ridha ( "Pages of al-Ridha"), also known as Sahifat of al-Reza and Sahifat al-Imam al-Ridha ("Book of Imam al-Ridha"), is a collection of 240 hadiths attributed to Ali ibn Musa al-Ridha, the eighth Shia Imam.

The Sahifah is one of the major sources of Shia belief and has attracted the attention of Shia scholars such as Ibn Babawayh and Sheikh Tabarsi. It contains hadiths on various topics including the invocation of Allah; the importance of praying five times a day and of saying the prayer for the dead; the excellence of the household of Muhammad, of the believer, of good manners, of the names Muhammad and Ahmad, of various foods, fruits, and ointments, of obeying parents, of strengthening the bonds of kinship, and of jihad; a warning against cheating, backbiting, or tattling; and other miscellaneous traditions. The section on Muhammad's household discusses each of its fourteen members separately.

Chain of authority

The version printed in Cairo by al-Ma'ahid Press in the year  (1921–1922) begins with the following chain of authorities: Its editor al-'Allāma 'Abd al-Wāsi' stated he received its contents on the authority of Sheikh 'Abd al-Wāsi', who received it from Imam al-Qāsim ibn Mohammed, who received it from Sheikh al-Sayyid Amīr al-Dīn ibn 'Abd Allah, who received it from al-Sayyid Ahmed ibn 'Abd Allah al-Wazīr, who received it from Imam al-Mutahhar ibn Mohammed ibn Sulayman, who received it from Imam  al-Mahdi Ahmed ibn Yahya, who received it from Sulayman ibn Ibrahīm ibn 'Umar al-'Alawi, who received it from his father Ibrahīm, who received it from Rida' al-Dīn Ibrahīm ibn Mohammed al-Tabari, who received it from Imam Najm al-Dīn al-Tabrīzi, who received it from al-Hafiz Ibn 'Asakir, who received it from Zahir al-Sinjani, who received it from al-Hafiz al-Bayhaqi, who received it  from Abu al-Qasim al-Mufassir, who received it from "Ibrahīm ibn khu'ra " (by mistake in text "Ju'da', who received it from Abu al-Qasim 'Abd Allah ibn Ahmed ibn 'Amir al-Ta'i in Basra, who received it from Ali al-Ridha, who claimed his father Musā claimed his father Ja'far claimed his father Muhammad claimed his father 'Ali claimed his father Husayn claimed his father 'Ali, son of Abū Tālib, had heard or witnessed its contents in the company of Muhammad.

Context

The principal narrator of the work was Abdallah ibn Aḥmad ibn Amer, who retells the words of Ali al-Ridha with each entry beginning with a variation of "Through his chain of authorities, he said". His father, who was said to have related these words to him, was killed at the Battle of Siffin. The family were descendants of Wahb ibn Amer who was killed with Husayn, son of Ali, at the Battle of Karbala.

His father died in a Baghdadi prison in Rajab, 183 AH (September, 799), during the caliphate of Harun al-Rashid, one of the Abbasid dynasty. Ali al-Ridha succeeded to his father's property but not fully to his title. He began to teach and issue fatwas from the mosque in Medina, where he lived, but the caliphs did not confirm his title and many of his father's trustees withheld their support (and tithes) under the pretense that his father would soon return as the Mahdi. Following Harun's death in 809, a civil war broke out between his sons Al-Amin and Al-Ma'mun. Al-Amin was beheaded in September 813 during the siege of Baghdad but his followers continued their resistance under local governors or in favor of Al-Ma'mun's uncle as late as 827.

The death of Al-Amin permitted Ali al-Ridha greater opportunity to teach. In  (815–816), Ali al-Ridha was invited or forced by Al-Ma'mun to quit his home and estates in Medina and leave for the imperial capital in Khorasan. He went further and named Ali al-Ridha as his crown prince and successor to the caliphate. Following the assassination of the imperial vizier and during a relocation of the capital back to Baghdad, Ali al-Ridha died suddenly, most probably on the last day of Safar,  (September, 818). Most sources accuse Al-Ma'mun of having poisoned him.

Contents

The version printed in Cairo by al-Ma'ahid Press in the year  (1921–1922) contained 163 hadiths divided into ten sections, the first nine of which concern particular topics and the last of which includes the remainder on miscellaneous topics. The last section ends with a note that the author "dropped some traditions mentioned in these two books of the Imām", considering them to be fabricated. He further noted that other scholars do not ascribe the book to Ali al-Ridha at all.

The ten sections are:
I: On the Invocation of God
II: On the Call to Prayer
III: On the Mandatory Prayers
IV: On the Excellence of the Household of the Prophet, in 3 parts:
Part One: On the Excellence of Ali bin Abu Talib
Part Two: On the Excellence of Fatima
Part Three: On the Excellence of Hasan and Husayn and the Household in General
V: On the Excellence of Believers, Good Manners, and Those Named Muhammad or Ahmad
VI: On Foods and Ointments
VII: On Filial Obedience and Strengthening Family Ties
VIII: On Avoidance of Cheating and Backbiting
IX: On the Excellence of Jihad, which is not given in full but condensed into a paraphrase
X: Miscellaneous Hadith

Some hadiths from the Sahifah:

Manuscripts

The following versions are available:
At the Allameh Amini library, written by Muhammad Ibn Muhammad Ibn Abd al-Qahhar Shirazi, in 761 AH
At the library of the Grand Mosque in Qom, written by Ridha bin Nizam bin Fakhruddin Hasani Amolie in 848 AH
At the library of Astan Quds Razavi, written by Ismail bin Abdul Momin Qaany in 881 AH
At the National Library of the Academy of Rome, narrated by Judge Abu Abdullah Muhammad bin Abdullah bin Hamza bin Abi Najma
In Egypt. The chain of narrators of this manuscript ends with Al-Bayhaqi.

See also

Al-Risalah al-Dhahabiah 
Al-Risalah al-Huquq
Al-Sahifa al-Sajjadiyya
List of Shia books

Notes

References

External links
The Sahifah of Imam Reza (AS), an English translation by the Sibtayn International Foundation
  [The Sahifeh of Imam Reza (PBUH), a translation from the Hejazi, p. 5]

Shia literature
Hadith
9th-century Arabic books
Ali al-Ridha